A motor glider is an aircraft which sustains flight principally through soaring flight but also has a small engine for takeoff and emergencies. For a list of unpowered gliders see Glider types. For an exhaustive list of all Glider types see List of gliders.

See also 

 Flight
 Gliding flight

Sources 
j2mcl-planeurs Comprehensive Glider Database
Glider polar data

Sailplane Directory

External links 

!
 Lists of aircraft by power source
 Lists of glider aircraft